Sequoyah High School is a public high school located in Hickory Flat, Georgia, United States. It educates students in grades 9–12. It opened in the fall of 1990 and is one of six high schools in Cherokee County.

The school is informally located in the small neighborhood of Hickory Flat on a three-school plot of land dubbed the Ralph Quarles Educational Complex, consisting of Hickory Flat Elementary, Dean Rusk Middle, and Sequoyah High School. The complex is on the northwest block of the intersection of East Cherokee Drive and Hickory Road.

Preliminary schools in the Sequoyah cluster are Hickory Flat, Indian Knoll, Mountain Road, and Holly Springs Elementaries, and Dean Rusk Middle School.

In athletics the school participates in Classification AAAA, Region/Area 7.

Athletics and activities
Sequoyah's Chief's colors are black and gold. The following Georgia High School Association sanctioned sports are offered:

Baseball
Basketball
Cross country
Competitive cheerleading
Football (boys) 
Golf
Gymnastics
Lacrosse
Soccer
Softball 
Swimming
Tennis
Track and field
Volleyball
State champion - 2014
Wrestling
State champion - 1996, 1999

Notable alumni

Danielle Donehew - Women's National Basketball Association (WNBA) executive
Hunter Gaddis - baseball player
Cullen Harper - college  football quarterback
 Bryce Leatherwood - winner of season 22 of The Voice.

References

External links

Public high schools in Georgia (U.S. state)
Educational institutions established in 1990
Schools in Cherokee County, Georgia
1990 establishments in Georgia (U.S. state)